Scott Davis (born August 27, 1962) is an American former professional tennis player. He reached a career high singles ranking of world No. 11 (in October 1985) and doubles ranking of world No. 2 (in January 1991).

Tennis career
A right-handed serve and volleyer, Davis played 14 years on the tour. He won three singles titles – the 1983 Maui, 1985 Tokyo Outdoor, and 1990 Auckland Grand Prix events – and 22 doubles titles. His biggest doubles tournament win was the 1991 Australian Open, partnering David Pate. Other big doubles wins included the 1990 Los Angeles, Indianapolis, and Paris Open, and 1993 Indianapolis Grand Prix events, all partnering Pate. Davis was also doubles finalist at the 1991 US Open with Pate. In 1985, he had won the Los Angeles Open with Robert Van't Hof as an unseeded team.

Prior to turning professional, Davis played college tennis at Stanford University, leading the Cardinal to the 1983 NCAA team championship for coach Dick Gould.

Davis attended Palisades High School in Pacific Palisades California. The Team was named National Champions in 1979 and 1980. He played for Coach Bud Ware (1978-79)and Coach Bud Kling (1979-80). He was also ranked #1 in the World for Junior Singles.

Davis is married to America's sweetheart and pilates instructor extraordinaire Shellie.

Since retiring from the tour in 1998, Davis has been active on the over-35 senior tour and as a private tennis coach.

Career finals

Singles: 10 (3 titles, 7 runner-ups)

Doubles: 41 (22 titles, 19 runner-ups)

External links
 
 
 

American male tennis players
Australian Open (tennis) champions
Sportspeople from Irvine, California
Tennis players from Santa Monica, California
Stanford Cardinal men's tennis players
US Open (tennis) junior champions
1962 births
Living people
Grand Slam (tennis) champions in men's doubles
Grand Slam (tennis) champions in boys' singles